Arroyo City is an Unincorporated community in northeast Cameron County, Texas.

Mexican herders settled the area in the 1860s and named the area after its location on the Arroyo Colorado. A post office opened in 1887. The same post office closed in 1907. In 1910 the community had about 10 people and two stores. Scattered houses remained in the area in the 1930s. Several businesses and dwellings remained in the 1970s. In 1990 Arroyo City was marked on Texas state highway maps.

There has never been a post office at Arroyo City. The nearest post office was at 109 Colorado Ave in Rio Hondo. Arroyo City was named in the 1950s on aviation maps to keep the pilots from being confused. The fishing lights reflected off the water and up into the skies. Pilots would question their position. Too far east to be Harlingen or Rio Hondo and too soon to be Brownsville or Los Fresnos so, the aviation industry named the arroyo fishing camps (about two and a half miles east to west fishing lights). In the 1930s to early 1960s it was no less than 7.5 miles to get there from the pavement through a single farm road of two tire tracks to get there in dry weather. Rain caused a stay of two or three days after it stopped. Fishing camps were old trailers, VTC (Valley Transit Co.) buses, and lean-tos. In the early 1950s (maybe late 1940s) the inter-coastal waterway was cut to the Port of Harlingen. This was done to straighten all the curves and switch backs to allow a tugboat to push barges to the Port of Harlingen.

There was an area to the east of the houses that was called the "cattle crossing" where ranchers would cross cattle by swimming them across the arroyo. Now, this would have happened after the channel was dredged. It had a straight shot from the inter-coastal waterway until it hit the curves with high banks in the arroyo.

There was only one store and several bait stands, a few had essential groceries and gas.

Education
In 1904 Arroyo City had a school with one teacher and twenty-four students.

References

External links

Unincorporated communities in Texas
Unincorporated communities in Cameron County, Texas